Anna-Bianca Schnitzmeier (born 27 July 1990) is a German former professional racing cyclist.

Palmares
2008
2nd Rhede Criterium
2009
3rd Wellinghofen Criterium
2012
8th European U23 Road Championship

2013 – Wiggle-Honda 2013 season

2014 – Wiggle-Honda 2014 season

References

Living people
German female cyclists
1990 births
Cyclists from Dortmund